Ullal Ravindra "U. R." Bhat is a noted economic columnist of India. He had his education in IIT Kanpur. He joined Indian Bank and quit to start a career in financial investments. He worked in Jardine Fleming India as head of the country operations. He is a regular at NDTV Profit Television channel. He works for Dalton Capital Advisors (India) Pvt. Ltd. He is also a director of Karnataka Bank. He belongs to Shivalli Brahmin community.

References

External links
Business Harvesting
Articles by U.R.Bhat

Indian bankers
Mangaloreans
Tulu people
Living people
Year of birth missing (living people)
IIT Kanpur alumni